Tom Kretzschmar (born 19 January 1999) is a German professional footballer who plays as a goalkeeper for 1860 Munich in the .

Career
Born in Munich, Kretzschmar joined 1860 Munich's youth academy from SpVgg Höhenkirchen in 2006. He made his senior debut for 1860 Munich II in the Bayernliga Süd in July 2017. In February 2021, he extended his contract with the club. He made his first-team debut on 22 May 2021 a substitute after goalkeeper Marco Hiller was sent-off in the 8th-minute of a 3–1 defeat to FC Ingolstadt.

References

External links

1999 births
Living people
German footballers
Footballers from Munich
Association football goalkeepers
3. Liga players
Oberliga (football) players
TSV 1860 Munich players
TSV 1860 Munich II players